The 2009–10 Scottish League Cup was the 64th season of the Scotland's second most prestigious football knockout competition, also known for sponsorship reasons as the Co-operative Insurance Cup. Rangers won the cup beating St Mirren 1–0 thanks to a goal from Kenny Miller.

The format of the competition was changed due to six Scottish clubs qualifying for European competition, two SPL clubs entered in the First Round.

Calendar

Note: the 4 best placed SPL teams not competing in European competition enter the tournament in the 2nd round and the 6 teams who are competing in European competition enter the tournament in the 3rd round.

First round
All 30 SFL clubs entered here, along with St Johnstone (as the team promoted to the SPL), and St Mirren (as the eleventh placed SPL team). The draw was held on 4 June 2009.

Source: BBC Sport

Second round
The 16 winners of the first round entered here, along with the remaining 4 SPL clubs not to have qualified for Europe. These were Dundee United, Hibernian, Kilmarnock, and Hamilton Academical.

Source: BBC Sport

Third round
The 10 winners of the second round entered here, along with the 6 Scottish clubs to have qualified for Europe. These were Rangers, Celtic, Heart of Midlothian, Aberdeen, Falkirk and Motherwell.

Source: BBC Sport

Quarter-finals

The quarter-final draw was conducted at Hampden Park, Glasgow on 24 September 2009. The ties were played in the week commencing 26 October.

Source: BBC Sport

Semi-finals

The semi-final draw was conducted at Tynecastle Stadium, Edinburgh on 9 November 2009. The ties were played in the week commencing 1 February 2010.

Source: BBC Sport

Final

The Final took place on Sunday 21 March.

Awards
A team, player and young player were chosen by the Scottish sports press as the top performers in each round.

Media coverage
The 2009/10 Scottish League Cup was shown live in the UK on BBC One Scotland and in Ireland on Setanta Ireland and Setanta Sports 1. In Australia it was shown live on Setanta Sports Australia. In US, The Caribbean and Canada it was broadcast live on Setanta Premium.

References

External links
 Scottish Cups BBC Sport
 News Scottish Football League

Scottish League Cup seasons
League Cup
League Cup